Samish refers to a Native American people who live in the U.S. state of Washington, a Central Coast Salish people. It may also refer to:

Places in Washington State, United States
Lake Samish in Whatcom County
Samish Bay in Puget Sound
Samish River
Samish Island, Washington, an unincorporated community in Skagit County

Other
Arthur Samish (1897–1974), American lobbyist
MV Samish, a ferry in Washington State
Samish language, also known as North Straits Salish language